The Mott–Bethe formula is an approximation used to calculate atomic electron scattering form factors, from atomic X-ray scattering form factors, . The formula was derived independently by Hans Bethe and Neville Mott both in 1930, and simply follows from applying the first Born approximation for the scattering of electrons via the Coulomb interaction together with the Poisson equation for the charge density of an atom (including both the nucleus and electron cloud) in the Fourier domain. Following the first Born approximation,

The electron scattering factor  has units of length, as is typical for the scattering factor, unlike the X-ray form factor  which is usually presented in dimensionless units. To perform a one-to-one comparison between the electron and X-ray form factors in the same units, the X-ray form factor should be multiplied by the square root of the Thomson cross section , where  is the classical electron radius, to convert it back to a unit of length.

The Mott–Bethe formula was originally derived for free atoms, and is rigorously true provided the X-ray scattering form factor is known exactly.

References 

Atomic physics
Scattering theory